Tom McGrath (23 October 1940 – 29 April 2009) was a Scottish playwright and jazz pianist.

Career
McGrath was born in Rutherglen, Glasgow. During the mid 1960s he was associated with the emerging UK underground culture, participating in Alexander Trocchi's Project Sigma, working as features editor of Peace News, and becoming founding editor of the International Times. During the early 1970s he worked with Billy Connolly on The Great Northern Welly-Boot Show. From 1974-77 he was director of the Third Eye Centre (named after the influence of Sri Chinmoy), an arts centre on Sauchiehall Street in Glasgow.

During this time, he wrote the popular play Laurel and Hardy. In 1977 he worked with Jimmy Boyle (then recently released from the Special Unit at Barlinnie jail) on the play The Hardman. McGrath's autobiographical 1979 play The Innocent relates his drug use and addiction during the 1960s. His play Animal, an excursion into the anthropoid substructure of society, featured in the programme of the Edinburgh International Festival in 1980 and was staged again by the Scottish Theatre Company in 1981.

In 1986 he wrote the script for a short film commissioned by COSLA and produced by Glasgow Film and Video Workshop. The film was written as a comedy-drama and toured Scotland on a bus after being shown at the Edinburgh Film Festival.

References

External links
Profile, scotlandonsunday.Scotsman.com, April 2005; retrieved 30 August 2017.
Who Was Tom McGrath?, Edinburgh Film Festival, April 2017; retrieved 22 April 2020.

1940 births
2009 deaths
Musicians from Glasgow
Scottish jazz pianists
Scottish dramatists and playwrights
20th-century British dramatists and playwrights
20th-century pianists
20th-century Scottish musicians
People from Rutherglen